The 2004 Brisbane Broncos season was the seventeenth in the club's history. They competed in the NRL's 2004 Telstra Premiership, making it to the finals again, but were knocked out of contention by the North Queensland Cowboys, their first ever loss to the club.

Season summary
The 2004 NRL season was Darren Lockyer's first in the position of five-eighth and Gorden Tallis' last as captain. The Broncos started the season by defeating the New Zealand Warriors 28-20 in Round 1, only to lose their next match against the Parramatta Eels by 26-18. The Broncos then won their next five matches, including a controversial match against the Tigers, during which the Broncos appeared to field 14 men at one stage of the match. In the 60th minute, Brisbane's Shane Webcke was taken off the ground after being knocked out by Bryce Gibbs; while he was assisted off the field, Corey Parker was brought on, and immediately scored off a Darren Lockyer pass to start a Broncos revival (they trailed 24-8 at halftime) which saw them claim a 32-24 victory. An ensuing investigation saw the Broncos stripped of two competition points, but, following a successful appeal, they were reinstated weeks later.

In round 10, the Broncos and the Newcastle Knights made history by contesting the first ever golden point match on free-to-air television. The Broncos lost the match 16-17 after Newcastle's Kurt Gidley booted a field goal three minutes and 26 seconds into extra time.

The Broncos eventually qualified for the finals for the thirteenth consecutive season after finishing the minor rounds in third place on the ladder (only behind eventual Grand Finalists the Sydney Roosters and the Bulldogs), but would bow out in straight sets, first losing to the Melbourne Storm at home by 31-14 before losing to the North Queensland Cowboys in Townsville, in what was captain Gorden Tallis' final game for the club. It also marked the first time the Broncos had lost to the Cowboys, and the first time the Broncos had been held scoreless anywhere in Queensland. With Tallis' retirement at the end of the season, the Broncos' captaincy was passed onto Darren Lockyer.

Match results

^ = Game following a State of Origin match

Ladder

Scorers

Honours

League
Nil

Club
Player of the year: Petero Civoniceva
Rookie of the year: Karmichael Hunt
Back of the year: Shaun Berrigan
Forward of the year: Petero Civoniceva
Club man of the year: Gorden Tallis

References

Brisbane Broncos seasons
Brisbane Broncos season